Jebba town is a Yoruba and Nupe city in Kwara State, Nigeria. Jebba is said to however be a "no man's land". It has views of the River Niger and has an estimated population of 22,411 as of 2007. The name of the king of Jebba is Oba Abdulkadir Adebara.

Gallery

See also 
 Railway stations in Nigeria

References

 
 

Populated places in Kwara State
Communities on the Niger River